Juan Manuel Munafo Horta (born 20 March 1988) is an Argentine professional footballer who plays as a midfielder for Greek Super League club Asteras Tripolis.

Career 
His career began in July 2009 when he signed a professional contract with Panthrakikos. He played in Panthrakikos from 2009 to 2013 and in Asteras Tripolis for the next two years. On 31 August 2015, he signed a two years' contract with his former club Platanias for an undisclosed fee.

On 2 August 2017, Asteras Tripolis officially announced the return of experienced defensive midfielder to the club, after two seasons. The 29-year-old Argentine, who was also a member of the ambitious Superleague club between 2013 and 2015 (83 performances in all competitions) and has played for Platanias since his first transfer move to Greece back in the summer of 2009 as well, signed two-season contract with the team of manager Staikos Vergetis, who knows him very well from their common spell at Asteras Tripolis, for an undisclosed fee. On 1 October 2017 he scored his first goal, opening the score in a 2–0 home win against AEK Athens, the first in the 2017–18 season. On 4 November 2018, he scored an 88th minute winner in a 1–0 home win against Panathinaikos.

Career statistics

References

External links
insports.gr 

Panthraxstats 

1988 births
Living people
Argentine footballers
Argentine expatriate footballers
Argentine expatriate sportspeople in Greece
Panthrakikos F.C. players
Platanias F.C. players
Asteras Tripolis F.C. players
Super League Greece players
Football League (Greece) players
Expatriate footballers in Greece
Association football midfielders
Sportspeople from Mendoza, Argentina
Argentine people of Italian descent